David Douglas (January 1, 1918 – November 16, 1978) was an American professional golfer who played on the PGA Tour in the 1940s and 1950s.

Early life
Douglas was the son of Alec Douglas, a golf professional originally from Scotland. At the time of David's birth Alec was the professional at Aronimink Golf Club in Philadelphia, Pennsylvania. In the early 1920s Alec became the professional at the newly opened Rock Manor Golf Club in Wilmington, Delaware and remained the professional there until retiring in 1957. Douglas turned professional in 1939 and was the club professional at the Newark Country Club in Newark, Delaware from 1940 to 1942. He qualified for the 1940 U.S. Open but failed to make the cut. After serving in the army in World War II he became an assistant professional to his father at Rock Manor. At 6' 2" tall and 165 pounds, he was lean and lanky and was known for his smooth swing.

Professional career
Douglas won eight tournaments on the PGA Tour between 1947 and 1954. He had his first win at the Orlando Open in December 1947. After the 72 holes he was tied on 274 with Jimmy Demaret and Herman Keiser. There was an 18-hole playoff the following day. Douglas and Demaret were again tied on 71 with Keiser taking 73. There was then a sudden-death playoff with Douglas winning with a birdie 3 at the first extra hole.

Douglas was a member of the American 1953 Ryder Cup team. He finished one place out of the qualifying places but with Ben Hogan and Dutch Harrison declining their invitations, he got a place along with Fred Haas. The match was played at the Wentworth Club in England. Douglas played with Ed Oliver in the first-day foursomes, winning 2 & 1. He played against Bernard Hunt in the singles on the second-day. The match was the last to finish. The American team led 6–5 and had retained the cup, but Douglas need to halve his match to give the Americans a clear win. Hunt had won the 12th, 13th, 16th and 17th holes to be dormie-one. At the last, Hunt's second shot was in the trees but he managed to get his third shot to the back of the green. He putted to 4 feet and, with Douglas taking 5, needed to hole the putt to win the match. He missed and so the USA won 6½ to 5½.

In October 1954 Douglas was a late replacement in the Lakes International Cup. Ed Furgol was part of the original American team of four but withdrew because an injured right arm. Australia won the cup for the first time, winning the match 7–5.

In 1957 Douglas became the club professional at St. Louis Country Club in Missouri and played less tournament golf from that date. He left that position in 1974 and moved to Terre du Lac Golf and Country Club, also in Missouri. He was briefly at Wedgewood Country Club, Missouri in 1978.

Death
Douglas died on cancer in November 1978 at Rehoboth Beach, Delaware. He was inducted into the Delaware Sports Museum and Hall of Fame earlier the same year, although he was unable to attend.

Professional wins (8)

PGA Tour wins (8)

PGA Tour playoff record (1–1)

Results in major championships

''Note: Douglas never played in The Open Championship.

NT = no tournament
CUT = missed the half-way cut
R64, R32, R16, QF, SF = round in which player lost in PGA Championship match play
"T" indicates a tie for a place

Summary

Most consecutive cuts made – 11 (1947 U.S. Open – 1952 Masters)
Longest streak of top-10s – 3 (1950 PGA – 1951 U.S. Open)

U.S. national team appearances
Ryder Cup: 1953 (winners)
Hopkins Trophy: 1952 (winners), 1954 (winners)
Lakes International Cup: 1954 (winners)

References

American male golfers
PGA Tour golfers
Ryder Cup competitors for the United States
Golfers from Delaware
United States Army personnel of World War II
Golfers from Philadelphia
People from Rehoboth Beach, Delaware
1918 births
1978 deaths